Negro cloth or Lowell cloth was a coarse and strong cloth used for slaves' clothing in the West Indies and the Southern Colonies. The cloth was imported from Europe (primarily Wales) in the 18th and 19th centuries.

The name Lowell cloth came from the town Lowell in Massachusetts, United States, where the cloth was produced.

The Act of 1735 
South Carolina's Negro Act of 1735 had various cheap materials dictated for slave clothes that include ''Negro cloth, duffelds, course kiersies, osnaburg, blue linen, checked linen, coarse calicoes and checked kinds of cotton''

Types 
Negro cloth was a woven material made of cotton or blended coarse threads also homespun. These were inexpensive and lower grades of cloth. Certain long cloths of coarser varieties and Salampore were among recognized Indian materials; the Dutch merchants called them ''Guinea or Negro cloth.''  ''Guinea cloth'' was a generic term for various inferior Indian piece goods traded for the purpose, such as inexpensive dyed plain and patterned calicoes like stripes and checks.

Quality 
Negro cloth was durable, but often regarded by its wearers as coarse, rough, and uncomfortable. Those freed from slavery recalled the cloth feeling akin to "needles sticking one all the time."

Garments 
The cloth was converted into various garments, such as breeches, jackets, skirts, bodices, shirts and trousers.

See also 

 History of slavery in Virginia
Osnaburg
Perpetuana
Tapsel (cloth)

References 

Textiles
Slavery in the United States
Slavery in the Caribbean
Slavery in North America